Cruickshank is a Scottish surname. Notable people with the surname include:

 Adrian Cruickshank (born 1936), Australian politician
 Alexander M. Cruickshank (1919–2017), American chemist
 Andrew Cruickshank (1907–1988), Scottish actor
 Art Cruickshank (1918–1983), American special effects artist
 Bobby Cruickshank (1894–1975), Scottish professional golfer
 Clare Cruickshank (died 2013), British cystic fibrosis sufferer remembered in Little Yellow Duck Project
 Dan Cruickshank (born 1949), British architectural historian and television presenter
 Daron Cruickshank (born 1985), Professional MMA fighter
 Frank Cruickshank (1931-2015), retired Scottish professional footballer
 George Cruickshank (disambiguation), several people
 Grahame Cruickshanks (1913–1941), South African cricketer
 Harry Cruickshank Harley (born 1928), Canadian politician
 Helen Cruickshank (1886–1975), Scottish poet and suffragette
 Helen G. Cruickshank (1902–1994), American nature writer and photographer of birds
 Jamie Cruickshank (born 1986), Canadian bobsledder
 Jessi Cruickshank (born 1983), Canadian television personality
 Jim Cruickshank (1941–2010), Scottish international football goalkeeper
 Jim Cruickshank (bishop) (1936-2015), Canadian bishop
 Joanna Cruickshank (1875–1958), British founder of the RAF Nursing Service in 1918
 John Cruickshank (disambiguation), several people
 Jorge Cruickshank García (1915–1989), Mexican politician
 Mandy-Rae Cruickshank (born 1974), Canadian free-diver
 Margaret Cruickshank (1873-1918), New Zealand medical practitioner
 Martin Melvin Cruickshank (1888-1964), Scottish surgeon, Chief Medical Officer for Delhi Province, Commander of the Indian Empire in 1942.
 Nancy Cruickshank, British entrepreneur in beauty, fashion, and technology
 Robert Cruickshank (disambiguation), several people
 Roger Cruickshank (born 1982), Scottish downhill skier and RAF pilot
 Sarah Cruickshank, Scottish Gaelic broadcaster
 Sheena Cruickshank, Immunologist
 Stephen Cruickshank (born 1983), Trinidadian soccer player
 William Cruickshank (chemist) (died 1810), Scottish chemist and military surgeon

See also
 Cruikshank, a spelling variation of the name
 Cruickshank Botanic Garden, Aberdeen, Scotland
 Cruickshank, Ontario
 Paul Cruickshank Racing
 William Cruikshank (disambiguation)